Aphelia christophi is a species of moth of the family Tortricidae. It is found in the Elburz Mountains in Iran.

The wingspan is about 28 mm for females and 23–26 mm for males.

References

Moths described in 1955
Aphelia (moth)
Moths of Asia